Homathko Estuary Provincial Park is a provincial park in British Columbia, Canada, located at the head of Bute Inlet surrounding the mouth of the Homathko River in the Pacific Ranges of the Coast Mountains.

See also
Great Canyon of the Homathko
Homathko Icefield
Homathko River-Tatlayoko Protected Area
Bishop River Provincial Park

References
BC Parks infopage

Provincial parks of British Columbia
Pacific Ranges
South Coast of British Columbia
1997 establishments in British Columbia
Protected areas established in 1997